Hemidactylus flavicauda the Mahabubnagar yellow-tailed brookiish gecko, is a species of house gecko from India.

References

Hemidactylus
Reptiles of India
Reptiles described in 2020
Taxa named by Varad B. Giri
Taxa named by Ishan Agarwal